Hopkins County is a county located in the U.S. state of Texas. As of the 2020 census, its population was 36,787. Its county seat is Sulphur Springs. Hopkins County is named for the family of David Hopkins, an early settler in the area. Hopkins County comprises the Sulphur Springs, TX Micropolitan Statistical Area. Hopkins County was once known as the Dairy Capital of Texas. Although dairy farms declined in the area in the late 1990s there are still a number of these located there. The Southwest Dairy Museum is located in Sulphur Springs.

Geography

Major highways
  Interstate 30
  U.S. Highway 67
  State Highway 11
  State Highway 19
  State Highway 154
  State Loop 301

Adjacent counties
 Delta County (north)
 Franklin County (east)
 Wood County (south)
 Rains County (southwest)
 Hunt County (west)

Communities

Cities
 Cumby
 Sulphur Springs (county seat)

Towns
 Como
 Tira

Unincorporated communities

 Addran
 Birthright
 Brashear
 Dike
 Gafford
 Miller Grove
 Pickton
 Saltillo
 Sulphur Bluff

Ghost towns
 Dillon
 Who'd Thought It

Demographics

Note: the US Census treats Hispanic/Latino as an ethnic category. This table excludes Latinos from the racial categories and assigns them to a separate category. Hispanics/Latinos can be of any race.

As of the census of 2000, there were 31,960 people, 12,286 households, and 8,882 families residing in the county. The population density was 41 people per square mile (16/km2). There were 14,020 housing units at an average density of 18 per square mile (7/km2). The racial makeup of the county was 85.11% White, 7.99% Black or African-American, 0.68% Native American, 0.25% Asian, 0.06% Pacific Islander, 4.55% from other races, and 1.36% from two or more races.  9.28% of the population were Hispanic or Latino of any race. At the 2020 census, its population increased to 36,787 with a predominantly non-Hispanic white population.

There were 12,286 households, out of which 32.50% had children under the age of 18 living with them, 58.50% were married couples living together, 10.00% had a female householder with no husband present, and 27.70% were non-families. 24.10% of all households were made up of individuals, and 11.80% had someone living alone who was 65 years of age or older.  The average household size was 2.56 and the average family size was 3.04.

In the county, the population was spread out, with 26.10% under the age of 18, 8.40% from 18 to 24, 27.30% from 25 to 44, 23.00% from 45 to 64, and 15.20% who were 65 years of age or older.  The median age was 37 years. For every 100 females, there were 96.10 males.  For every 100 females age 18 and over, there were 93.30 males.

The median income for a household in the county was $32,136, and the median income for a family was $38,580. Males had a median income of $30,377 versus $20,751 for females. The per capita income for the county was $17,182.  About 11.30% of families and 14.60% of the population were below the poverty line, including 17.40% of those under age 18 and 14.60% of those age 65 or over.

Media
KSST AM 1230 and Suddenlink Cable Channel 18 serve Hopkins County from Sulphur Springs. Hopkins County is part of the Dallas/Fort Worth DMA. The county is served by one newspaper, the Sulphur Springs News-Telegram, part of Southern Newspapers, Inc. Local media outlets are: KDFW-TV, KXAS-TV, WFAA-TV, KTVT-TV, KERA-TV, KTXA-TV, KDFI-TV, KDAF-TV, and KFWD-TV. Other nearby stations that provide coverage for Hopkins County are from the Tyler/Longview/Jacksonville market and they include: KLTV-TV, KYTX-TV, KFXK-TV, KCEB-TV, and KETK-TV. In the City of Sulphur Springs Suddenlink Communications continues to offer KLTV-TV, KYTX-TV, and KETK-TV on its Cable Television services for the area.

Politics

See also

 National Register of Historic Places listings in Hopkins County, Texas
 Recorded Texas Historic Landmarks in Hopkins County

References

External links

 Hopkins County website
 

 
1846 establishments in Texas
Populated places established in 1846